Seth Michael Beer (born September 18, 1996) is an American professional baseball outfielder and first baseman for the Arizona Diamondbacks of Major League Baseball (MLB). He played college baseball for the Clemson Tigers. Beer made his MLB debut in 2021.

Amateur career
Beer attended Lambert High School in Forsyth County, Georgia. As a junior, he hit .560 with eight home runs and 41 runs batted in (RBIs) and as a sophomore hit .589 with 10 home runs. Due to his age, Beer was able to graduate from high school early and attend Clemson University to play college baseball for the Clemson Tigers.

Beer was a starter his freshman year at Clemson in 2016. His first collegiate home run was a grand slam. Against Boston College, he hit a 10th inning walk-off home run. Beer was named the National Midseason Player of the Year by Perfect Game after hitting .430/.538/.935 with 13 home runs and 37 RBIs in 27 games.  He was awarded the Dick Howser Trophy for the national college player of the year for the 2016 season, the first time the award was given to a freshman.

Professional career

Houston Astros
The Houston Astros selected Beer in the first round, with the 28th overall selection, of 2018 MLB draft. Beer signed with the Astros on June 13, 2018 for a $2.25 million signing bonus. He was assigned on June 15, 2018 to the Tri-City ValleyCats of the Short-Season A New York–Penn League, where he hit a two-run homer in his minor league debut. On June 27, Beer was promoted to the Quad Cities River Bandits of the Class A Midwest League. On July 30, after a short stint with the River Bandits, Beer was promoted to the Buies Creek Astros of the Class A-Advanced Carolina League. In 67 games between the three teams, he slashed .304/.389/.496 with 12 home runs and 42 RBIs.

Beer began 2019 in the Carolina League again with the team renamed the Fayetteville Woodpeckers. Beer was promoted to the Corpus Christi Hooks of the Double-A Texas League in May.

Arizona Diamondbacks
On July 31, 2019, the Astros traded Beer to the Arizona Diamondbacks along with prospects J.B. Bukauskas, Corbin Martin, and Joshua Rojas for Zack Greinke. He was assigned to the Jackson Generals of the Southern League, finishing the season there. Over 122 games between Fayetteville, Corpus Christi, and Jackson, Beer batted .289/.388/.516 with 26 home runs, 31 hit by pitch, and 103 RBIs. On July 7, 2020, it was announced that Beer had tested positive for COVID-19. Beer began the 2021 season with the Reno Aces.

On September 10, 2021, Beer was selected to the 40-man roster and promoted to the major leagues for the first time. In his MLB debut that day, Beer homered against the Seattle Mariners' Diego Castillo, becoming the 129th player in MLB history to homer in his first major-league at-bat. On September 14, Beer suffered a dislocated left shoulder and was placed on the injured list three days later.

In 2021 with AAA Reno he batted .287/.398/.511 with 73 runs (2nd in the AAA-West), 33 doubles (3rd), and 30 hit by pitch (leading the league) in 362 at bats.

Beer hit a walk-off three-run homer to give the Diamondbacks a 4–2 Opening Day victory over the San Diego Padres on April 7, 2022, and he became the first rookie in Major League history to hit a walk-off home run while trailing on Opening Day, which was also coincidentally National Beer Day. Beer was optioned to the minors on May 15.

Personal
Beer was also a swimmer when he was younger and at 12 years old set national records in the 50-meter backstroke and 100-meter backstroke. He later quit swimming to focus on baseball after two high school seasons. He also played two seasons of high school football.

References

External links

Clemson Tigers bio

1996 births
Living people
People from Maryville, Illinois
Baseball players from Illinois
Major League Baseball outfielders
Arizona Diamondbacks players
Clemson Tigers baseball players
All-American college baseball players
Tri-City ValleyCats players
Quad Cities River Bandits players
Buies Creek Astros players
Fayetteville Woodpeckers players
Corpus Christi Hooks players
Jackson Generals (Southern League) players
Salt River Rafters players
Reno Aces players